Kharitonovo is a rural locality (a settlement) in Kotlassky District, Arkhangelsk Oblast, Russia. The population was 1,419 as of 2012. There are 28 streets.

Geography 
Kharitonovo is located 73 km northeast of Kotlas (the district's administrative centre) by road. Zalupya is the nearest rural locality.

References 

Rural localities in Kotlassky District